James Joseph Gleeson (March 5, 1912 – May 1, 1996) was an American outfielder, scout and coach in Major League Baseball. A native of Kansas City, Missouri, and a 1927 Rockhurst High School graduate, he attended Rockhurst University.

Gleeson played all or parts of five seasons (1936; 1939–42) in Major League Baseball for the Cleveland Indians, Chicago Cubs and Cincinnati Reds. In his best season, for the 1940 Cubs, Gleeson appeared in 129 games, batted 485 times and made 152 hits, including 39 doubles, 11 triples, five home runs and 61 runs batted in; he batted .313 that season. Overall, Gleeson appeared in 392 Major-League games, batting .263 with 16 home runs and 154 RBI. Defensively, he posted a .972 fielding percentage playing at all three outfield positions.

He remained in the game after his playing career ended as a minor league manager, and Major League scout and coach. Although he worked for a time for his "hometown" Kansas City Athletics as a scout and Major League coach, he spent much of his career in the New York Yankees' organization, serving as the first-base coach on Yogi Berra's staff during the Yanks'  pennant-winning season.

He died in Kansas City at the age of 84.

External links

 Baseball Chronology: 1957 Kansas City Athletics
 

1912 births
1996 deaths
Baseball players from Kansas City, Missouri
Binghamton Triplets managers
Chicago Cubs players
Cincinnati Reds players
Cleveland Indians players
Columbus Red Birds players
Kansas City Athletics coaches
Kansas City Blues (baseball) players
Louisville Colonels (minor league) players
Major League Baseball first base coaches
Major League Baseball outfielders
Milwaukee Brewers (minor league) players
Milwaukee Brewers scouts
Muskegon Reds players
Newark Bears (IL) players
New Orleans Pelicans (baseball) players
New York Yankees coaches
New York Yankees scouts
Rockhurst University alumni
Zanesville Greys players